The Cabinet of Geir Hallgrímsson in Iceland was formed 28 August 1974.

Cabinet

Inaugural cabinet: 28 August 1974 – 1 September 1978

See also
Government of Iceland
Cabinet of Iceland

References

Geir Hallgrimsson, Cabinet of
Geir Hallgrimsson, Cabinet of
Geir Hallgrimsson, Cabinet of
Cabinets established in 1974
Cabinets disestablished in 1978
Independence Party (Iceland)
Progressive Party (Iceland)